Malcolm (Mal) McMartin (born 1944) is an Australian former rugby league footballer who played in the 1960s and 1970s.

Playing career
McMartin started his first grade career at the Penrith Panthers in 1968. He remained there for four seasons between 1968-1971. He then joined Balmain for two seasons between 1972-1973. 

He finished his career at the Parramatta Eels for two seasons between 1974-1975 and often played with his identical twin brother, John McMartin.

References

1944 births
Living people
Penrith Panthers players
Balmain Tigers players
Parramatta Eels players
Australian rugby league players
Rugby league centres
Rugby league wingers
Place of birth missing (living people)